Gerald Vega Morales (born July 22, 1986) is a Puerto Rican weightlifter. Vega represented Puerto Rico at the 2008 Summer Olympics in Beijing, where she competed for the women's lightweight category (58 kg). Vega placed ninth in this event, as she successfully lifted 90 kg in the single-motion snatch, and hoisted 112 kg in the two-part, shoulder-to-overhead clean and jerk, for a total of 202 kg.

References

External links
NBC Olympics Profile
 Geralee Vega Olympics Profile

Puerto Rican female weightlifters
1986 births
Living people
Olympic weightlifters of Puerto Rico
Weightlifters at the 2008 Summer Olympics
American female weightlifters
20th-century Puerto Rican women
21st-century Puerto Rican women